The 2007 Benue State gubernatorial election was the 6th gubernatorial election of Benue State. Held on April 14, 2007, the People's Democratic Party nominee Gabriel Suswam won the election, defeating Daniel Saror of the All Nigeria Peoples Party.

Results 
Gabriel Suswam from the People's Democratic Party won the election, defeating Daniel Saror from the All Nigeria Peoples Party. Registered voters was 2,150,515.

References 

Benue State gubernatorial elections
Benue gubernatorial
Benue State gubernatorial election